Robert Elder may refer to:

Robert A. Elder (1918–1994), U.S. Air Force colonel, WWII flying ace
Robert J. Elder Jr. (born 1952), U.S. Air Force general
 Robert K. Elder (born 1976), American journalist, author and film columnist
 Rob Elder (born 1981), archer from Fiji
 Robert Elder (minister) (1808–1892), Moderator of the General Assembly of the Free Church of Scotland 1871/72
 Robert Lee Elder (born 1934), American golfer